Musaad bin Khalid bin Musaad bin Abdulrahman Al Saud is a Saudi prince and businessman. He is the son of Prince Khalid Bin Musa’ad bin Abdulrahman Al Saud, a prominent Saudi businessman in real estate. His mother is Princess Abeer bint Faisal bin Abdulrahman bin Ahmad Al Sudairy.

Early life and education 
Musa’ad was born on 20 January 1993 in Riyadh, Saudi Arabia. His grandfather from his father's side is Prince Musa’ad bin Abdulrahman Al Saud, who served as the minister of interior and the minister of finance. He was the younger brother of King Abdulaziz bin Abdulrahman Al Saud, the founder of Saudi Arabia. His grandfather from his mother's side is Faisal bin Abdulrahman bin Ahmed Al Sudairi, former deputy governor of Al Jawf and former and first undersecretary of interior ministry for security affairs in the. Later he focused his career in business in the fields of construction, real estate, and farming.

Musa’ad holds a bachelor of science degree in business administration with a major in project management from Al Faisal University. He speaks Arabic, English, and Italian.

Business activities and positions held
In 2010, Musa’ad established a leading football academy focusing on the development of youth players. It was also used as a training facility for other football teams in Riyadh, Saudi Arabia.
 
In 2015, Musa’ad was a member of the consultant team, Prince Abdullah Bin Musa’ad Bin Abdulaziz Al Saud had during his time as the President of the General Sports Authority in Saudi Arabia.

In 2016, Musa’ad joined Ernst & Young. He held three positions during his time there: Consultant, Senior Consultant in Strategy & Customer, and EY's Sport & Entertainment Sector Manager at EY MENA Advisory Services.

Musa’ad was the chairman of Sheffield United F.C. from 2019 to 2021 and is the director of K Beerschot VA.

Personal life
Musa’ad has four sisters; Princess Sarah, Princess Hala, Princess Munirah, and Princess Al Johara.

Musa’ad married to Princess Latifa bint Abdullah bin Musa’ad bin Abdulaziz Al Saud in 2015.

References

1993 births
Living people
People from Riyadh
21st-century Saudi Arabian businesspeople
Saudi Arabian Sunni Muslims
Sheffield United F.C. directors and chairmen
Saudi Arabian expatriates in England